Trechalea is a genus of spider in the family Trechaleidae, found in the United States to Peru and Brazil.

Taxonomy
The genus was first created by Carl L. Koch in 1848, and given the name Triclaria. However, this name was already in use for a genus of parrots, and in 1869, Tord T.T. Thorell proposed the replacement name Trechalea. The name is derived from the Greek , meaning "rough" or "savage".

Species
, the World Spider Catalog accepted the following species:

Trechalea amazonica F. O. Pickard-Cambridge, 1903 – Trinidad, Colombia, Brazil
Trechalea bucculenta (Simon, 1898) – Colombia, Brazil, Argentina, Bolivia
Trechalea connexa (O. Pickard-Cambridge, 1898) – Mexico
Trechalea extensa (O. Pickard-Cambridge, 1896) – Mexico to Panama
Trechalea gertschi Carico & Minch, 1981 – USA, Mexico
Trechalea longitarsis (C. L. Koch, 1847) (type species) – Colombia, Ecuador, Peru
Trechalea macconnelli Pocock, 1900 – Ecuador, Peru, Brazil, Guyana, Suriname
Trechalea paucispina Caporiacco, 1947 – Peru, Brazil, Guyana
Trechalea tirimbina Silva & Lapinski, 2012 – Costa Rica

References

Araneomorphae genera
Spiders of North America
Spiders of South America